Assam is a state in northeastern India.

Assam may also refer to:

Historical places
 Kingdom of Assam, the Ahom Kingdom, as it was known in medieval times
 Colonial Assam, a period of time between (1826-1947) when Assam was under British colonial rule
 Eastern Bengal and Assam, a province of British India between (1905-1912)
 Assam Province, a province of British India between (1912-1947)

Other uses
 Assam Company, the British company that administered Colonial Assam in the 19th century
 Assam Oil, a division of Oil India Company
 Assam Rifles, a paramilitary force in India
 Assam Regiment, an army regiment in India
 Assam silk, the silks that are produced in Assam
 Assam tea, the tea that is produced in Assam
 S.S. Assam, a steamer shipwrecked in June 1842
 A character from Girls und Panzer

See also
 
 ASAM (disambiguation)